John Stransky Jr. (June 19, 1904 - March 22, 1996) was an American sound engineer. He was nominated for an Primetime Emmy Award in the category Outstanding Sound Mixing for the television film My Sweet Charlie. Stransky died in March 1996 of pancreatic cancer at the Motion Picture & Television Fund cottages in Woodland Hills, California, at the age of 91.

References

External links 

1904 births
1996 deaths
People from South Dakota
Deaths from pancreatic cancer
American audio engineers
20th-century American engineers